Krasne  is a village in the administrative district of Gmina Uścimów, within Lubartów County, Lublin Voivodeship, in eastern Poland.

The village has an approximate population of 550.

References

Villages in Lubartów County